Seasons Change may refer to:

Film and television
 Seasons Change (film), a 2006 Thai romantic comedy
 "Seasons Change", a 2008 episode of Property Virgins

Music

Albums
 Seasons Change (Lee Konitz and Karl Berger album), 1979
 Seasons Change (Scotty McCreery album), 2018
 Seasons Change, by Ray Boltz, 1992
 Seasons Change, a mixtape by Poolside, 2010

Songs
 "Seasons Change" (song), by Exposé, 1987
 "Seasons Change", by Anastacia from Anastacia, 2004
 "Seasons Change", by Corinne Bailey Rae from Corinne Bailey Rae, 2006
 "Season's Change", by Jagged Edge from Jagged Edge, 2006
 "Seasons Change", by Michael Martin Murphey from Swans Against the Sun, 1976
 "Seasons Change", by Quasimoto from Yessir Whatever, 2013

See also
 Seasons of Change – The Complete Recordings 1970–1974, an album by Fraternity, 2021
 Season of Changes, an album by Brian Blade & The Fellowship Band, 2008